The Banping Lake Wetland Park is a constructed wetland in Zuoying District, Kaohsiung, Taiwan.

History
The area around the park used to be a geological limestone mountain called Mount Banping. It used to be an important source of Taiwan's limestone ore needs. In 1997, the mining activities ceased to operate after 30 years of activity and the mining area began to recover to its original condition. Several years later, the Kaohsiung City Government carried out a conservation plan to protect the soil and water for the abandoned mine area. After years of restorative afforestation and rehabilitation, the mountain slowly regained its original beauty.

In 2004, the Kaohsiung Association of Hydraulic Engineers was commissioned by Kaohsiung City Government to execute an evaluation of the possibility of using the Chien Tai Cement Company's grit chamber area at the southern side of Banping Mountain for a wetland park. The result of the evaluation was positive and that in 2005 the City Government budgeted for and built up a nature park at the foot of the northwestern side of the mountain. They also afforested and constructed five flood-detention grit chambers at the southern side of the mountain foot. Man-made wetlands were also created to effectively function as grit-removal and flood-detention bodies.

Geology
The park spans over an area of 13 hectares. It features viewing platforms and bird-watching huts.

Transportation
The wetland is accessible within walking distance north of Xinzuoying Station.

See also
 Mining in Taiwan
 Gaomei Wetlands

References

2005 establishments in Taiwan
Constructed wetlands in Taiwan
Landforms of Kaohsiung
Tourist attractions in Kaohsiung
Zuoying District